Kitagwenda District is a district in Western Uganda. The district is named after Kitagwenda County, which is coterminous with the district.

Kitagwenda District is part of the Kingdom of Toro, one of the ancient traditional monarchies in Uganda. The kingdom is coterminous with Toro sub-region, home to an estimated 1 million inhabitants in 2002, according to the national population and housing census conducted that year. The districts that constitute the sub-region are: 
(a) Bunyangabu District (b) Kabarole District (c) Kamwenge District (d) Kyegegwa District (e) Kyenjojo District and (f) Kitagwenda District.

Location
Kitagwenda District is bordered by Kabarole District to the northwest and north, Kamwenge District to the northeast, Ibanda District to the east and southeast, Rubirizi District to the southwest and Kasese District to the west.

The coordinates of Kitagwenda District are: 0°01'43.0"S, 30°20'10.0"E (Latitude:-0.028611; Longitude:30.336111).

Overview
The district was created in 2019 by Act of Parliament. Prior to then, it was part of Kamwenge District. The district is coterminous with Kitagwenda County, after which it is named. It is predominantly a rural area district.

Kitagwenda is made up of one county, two town councils and five sub-counties. The town councils are 1. Ntara and 2. Kabujogera. The sub-counties are Nyabbani, Ntara, Kanara, Kicheche and Mashyoro.

There are numerous aquatic systems in the district including:

 Lake George
 River Mpanga
 Dura River 
 Kyambura Game Reserve|Rwenshama Falls
 Katonga Wildlife Reserve|Katonga Nature Reserve
 Queen Elizabeth National Park
 Kashyoha-Kitomi forest reserve
 The Western Rift Valley
 Kinyamugara East African Plateau
 Bachwezi habitats around Kikondo hills
 Cycad Encephalartos whitelockii
 Mokele mbembe
 Mashyoro Tree of life

Population
The 2011, the population of Kitagwenda County was estimated at about 129,600 inhabitants. The national population census and household survey held on 27 August 2014, enumerated the population of Kitagwenda at 165,354 people. The predominant ethnic group in the district are Batagwenda and the language spoken is Rutagwenda.

See also
 Ntara
 Empire of Kitara
 Toro sub-region
 Western Region, Uganda
 Districts of Uganda

References

External links
 Kitagwenda: The Undiscovered Haven In The West As of 24 November 2019.
 Kitagwenda District Official Website

 
Districts of Uganda
Western Region, Uganda
Toro sub-region